The Yankee 38 is an American sailboat that was designed by Sparkman & Stephens as racer-cruiser and first built in 1972.

The design was a development of the 1971 IOR One Ton Cup racing boat Lightnin.

The Yankee 38 design was developed into the Catalina 38 in 1978, after Yankee Yachts went out of business and the molds were sold to Frank V. Butler.

Production
The boat was Sparkman & Stephens design #2094-C2 and was built by Yankee Yachts in the United States. The company completed 30 examples of the type between 1972 and 1975, but it is now out of production.

Design
The Yankee 38 is a recreational keelboat, built predominantly of fiberglass, with wood trim. It has a masthead sloop rig, a raked stem, a raised counter reverse transom, a skeg-mounted rudder controlled by a tiller and a fixed swept fin keel. It displaces  and carries  of lead ballast.

The design has sleeping accommodation for eight people, with a bow cabin with a "V"-berth, dual main cabin settee and pilot berths and two quarter berths aft, under the cockpit. The head is located aft of the bow cabin, on the port side.

See also
List of sailing boat types

Related development
Catalina 38

Similar sailboats
Alajuela 38
C&C 38
Columbia 38
Eagle 38
Farr 38
Hunter 380
Hunter 386
Landfall 38
Sabre 38
Shannon 38

References

Keelboats
1970s sailboat type designs
Sailing yachts
Sailboat type designs by Sparkman and Stephens
Sailboat types built by Yankee Yachts